The Afghanistan Oil Pipeline was a project proposed by several oil companies to transport oil from the Caspian region and Central Asia through Afghanistan to Pakistan.

History
In the 1990s, the American Unocal Corporation, in addition to the Trans-Afghanistan Gas Pipeline, considered building a   oil pipeline to link Türkmenabat in Turkmenistan to the  Pakistan's Arabian Sea coast. Through the Omsk (Russia) – Pavlodar (Kasakhstan) – Shymkent – Türkmenabat pipeline, it would provide a possible alternative export route for regional oil production from the Caspian Sea. The pipeline was expected to cost US$2.5 billion. However, due to political and security instability at that time, the project was dismissed.

Disputed theory 
Some have proposed that the actual motive for the United States-led Western invasion of Afghanistan in 2001 was Afghanistan's importance as a conduit for oil pipelines to Afghanistan's neighbouring countries, by effectively bypassing Russian and Iranian territories, and breaking the Russian and Iranian collective monopoly on regional energy supplies. Others have argued that the theoretical pipeline was not a significant reason for the invasion because most Western governments and their respective oil companies preferred an export route that went through the Caspian Sea to Azerbaijan then to Georgia and on to the Black Sea instead of one that goes through Afghanistan.

See also

Ashgabat agreement
North-South Transport Corridor

References

Oil pipelines in Turkmenistan
Oil pipelines in Afghanistan
Oil pipelines in Pakistan
Afghanistan–Pakistan relations
Afghanistan–Turkmenistan relations
Pakistan–Turkmenistan relations